Hami Yawari (died 2011) was a politician in Papua New Guinea. He served as governor of Southern Highlands Province from 2002 to 2007.

References

Year of birth missing
2011 deaths
Governors of Southern Highlands Province
Government ministers of Papua New Guinea